Cambridge Stud is a Thoroughbred stud farm established in 1976 at Cambridge, New Zealand by Sir Patrick Hogan.

Stud sires
It has had a number of top quality stallions including:
 Sir Tristram: sire of 45 Group 1 winners and inducted into the New Zealand Racing Hall of Fame.
 Almanzor: winner of the 2015 Grand Critérium de Bordeaux, 2016 Prix de Guiche, Prix du Jockey Club, Prix Guillaume d'Ornano, Irish Champion Stakes, Champion Stakes.
 Burgundy: winner of the Cambridge Breeders Stakes (1200m) and Mr Tiz Trophy (1200m).
 Cape Blanco
  Cape Cross, winner of the 1998 Group 1 Lockinge Stakes and Group 2 Queen Anne Stakes and Celebration Mile of 1999. Sire of Seachange.
 Embellish: winner of the 2017 New Zealand 2000 Guineas
 Hello Youmzain: winner of the 2018 Critérium de Maisons-Laffitte, 2019 Sandy Lane Stakes, Haydock Sprint Cup and 2020 Diamond Jubilee Stakes.
 Highly Recommended: winner of the 2012 Alister Clark Stakes
 Keeper
 Lucky Unicorn
 Maroof
 One Cool Cat
 Rhythm
 Stravinsky: winner of the 1999 Group 1 July Cup at Newmarket and Nunthorpe Stakes
 Tavistock
 Viking Ruler
 Zabeel

Broodmares
It was also home to the great broodmare Eight Carat (GB) by Pieces of Eight from Klairessa. She was New Zealand Broodmare of the Year in 1995, 1996 and 1997. In 1996 Eight Carat was named Broodmare of the Year by the international journal Owner-Breeder (USA).

Taiona, the dam of Gurner’s Lane, won the NZ Broodmare of the Year in 1981 and 1983.

Change of ownership
It was purchased by Brendan and Jo Lindsay in 2017. They appointed Henry Plumptre as Chief Executive.

See also
 Thoroughbred racing in New Zealand
 Trelawney Stud
 Windsor Park Stud

References

External links
Cambridge Stud
Cambridge Stud

Horse farms
Farms in New Zealand
Buildings and structures in Waikato
Cambridge, New Zealand